The Swedish entry for the Eurovision Song Contest 1967 was Östen Warnerbring and the song "Som en dröm", composed by Curt Pettersson and Marcus Österdahl and written by Patrice Hellberg. The national selection was for the first time called "Melodifestivalen", a name that remains to this day.

Before Eurovision

Melodifestivalen 1967 
Melodifestivalen 1967 was the selection for the ninth song to represent Sweden at the Eurovision Song Contest. It was the eighth time that this system of picking a song had been used. Approximately 1,800 songs were submitted to SVT for the competition. The final was held in the Cirkus in Stockholm on 24 February 1967, hosted by Maud Husberg and broadcast on Sveriges Radio TV but it was not broadcast on radio.

At Eurovision 
The entry finished 8th out of 17.

Voting

References

External links 
ESCSweden.com (in Swedish)
Information site about Melodifestivalen
Eurovision Song Contest National Finals

1967
Countries in the Eurovision Song Contest 1967
1967
Eurovision
Eurovision